The 2015 Australian GT Championship was a CAMS sanctioned Australian motor racing championship open to FIA GT3 cars and similar cars as approved for the championship. The Australian GT Sportscar Group Pty Ltd was appointed by CAMS as the Category Manager for the championship. The title, which was the 19th Australian GT Championship, was won by Christopher Mies, driving an Audi R8 Ultra.

Race calendar

The championship was contested over six rounds.

Divisions
Drivers' titles were awarded in four divisions.
 GT Championship - for FIA GT3 specification vehicles
 GT Trophy - for older specification FIA GT3 vehicles
 GT Challenge - for cars that no longer fitted within the GT Championship and GT Trophy divisions
 GT Sports - for GT4 specification cars

Championship standings

 The driver gaining the highest points total over all rounds of the Championship, within their division, was declared the winner of that division.
 If two drivers competed in the same automobile for all, or the majority of the rounds, then the final division position was awarded to both drivers.

2015 Australian Tourist Trophy
The 2015 Australian Tourist Trophy was awarded by the Confederation of Australian Motor Sport to the driver accumulating the highest aggregate points total from Rounds 2 and 4 of the Australian GT Championship. The title, which was the 25th Australian Tourist Trophy, was won by Christopher Mies driving an Audi R8 Ultra.

References

External links

Australian GT Championship
GT